Sasha Paysinger  is a voice actress for ADV Films and Sentai Filmworks for English-dubbed anime titles. Her major roles include Hatoko Kobayashi in Angelic Layer, Asami in Mezzo DSA, Nana in Elfen Lied, Marie in Sister Princess, and Shin in Pretear. When away from voice acting, she has worked as a flight attendant.

Voice roles
Air - Yakumo (Ep. 4)
AKB0048 - Atsuko Maeda the 13th
Angelic Layer - Hatoko Kobayashi
Aquarian Age: Sign for Evolution - Rumiko Sakamoto
Azumanga Daioh - Miruchi (Ep. 12)
Best Student Council - Seina Katsura
Campione! - Pandora
Chrono Crusade - Sister Claire
Coyote Ragtime Show - August
D.N.Angel - Freedert, Menou Kurashima (Ep. 8), Miho (Ep. 6), Misaki Nishizawa (Ep. 3)
Divergence Eve - Kotoko-01
Elfen Lied - Nana
Gantz - Shiori Kisimoto
Gilgamesh - The Concierge
Godannar - Ami (Ep. 26), Luna
Gravion - Cecile
Hello Kitty's Animation Theater - My Melody
Infinite Stratos II  - Chloe Chronicle (Ep. 12), Phee (Ep. 8)
Jing, King of Bandits: Seventh Heaven - Benedictine
Kaleido Star - Luci Robbins, Mila (Ep. 14)
Madlax - Eric's Sister
Maburaho - Elizabeth
Megazone 23 - Mai Yumekanou
Mezzo DSA - Asami Igarashi
Misaki Chronicles - Kotoko-02
Momo: The Girl God of Death - Mai Makihara (Ep. 1)
Nanaka 6/17 - Kuriko Aratama
Outbreak Company - Romilda Gardo
Pani Poni Dash! - Misao Nanjo
Pretear - Shin
Princess Tutu - Lilie
Puni Puni Poemi - Ms. Ishii
Saint Seiya - Miho (ADV Dub)
Saiyuki: Requiem - Kanan
Sister Princess - Marie
The Super Dimension Fortress Macross - Mei
UFO Ultramaiden Valkyrie - Nanna (OVA 4)
UQ Holder! - Nodoka Miyazaki
Utawarerumono - Aruruu
When Supernatural Battles Became Commonplace - Chifuyu Himeki

References

External links
Sasha Paysinger at the English Voice Actor & Production Staff Database

The Sasha Paysinger Fan Group

Living people
American voice actresses
Flight attendants

Year of birth missing (living people)
21st-century American women